Kevin Brochman (born July 6, 1959) is an American cross-country skier. He competed at the 1984 Winter Olympics and the 1988 Winter Olympics.

References

1959 births
Living people
American male cross-country skiers
Olympic cross-country skiers of the United States
Cross-country skiers at the 1984 Winter Olympics
Cross-country skiers at the 1988 Winter Olympics
People from Stillwater, Minnesota